The following television stations broadcast on digital channel 9 in Mexico:

 XHCSAC-TDT in Purépero, Michoacán
 XHPBLM-TDT in Lagos de Moreno, Jalisco
 XHQMGU-TDT in Guadalajara, Jalisco

09